Arthur Jelf may refer to:
 Sir Arthur Richard Jelf, English judge
 Sir Arthur S. Jelf, British colonial administrator